Sir Haydn may refer to

Sir Henry Haydn Jones (1863-1950) - Welsh politician
Sir Haydn (locomotive) - a steam locomotive named after Sir Henry Haydn Jones.